Desserts is a 1998 short film directed by Jeff Stark and starring Ewan McGregor.

Cast
Ewan McGregor as Stroller

Plot

A man (the stroller) is walking along a beach and finds a chocolate éclair, ponders over it for a bit then decides to eat it, then suddenly is yanked into the sea by a hook and line.

External links

1998 short films
1998 films
1998 drama films
Films scored by Simon Boswell